2010 Nadeshiko League Cup Final was the 6th final of the Nadeshiko League Cup competition. The final was played at Nishigaoka Soccer Stadium in Tokyo on August 22, 2010. Nippon TV Beleza won the championship.

Overview
Nippon TV Beleza won their 2nd title, by defeating Urawa Reds Ladies 3–2 with Shinobu Ono, Kanako Ito and Mana Iwabuchi goal.

Match details

See also
2010 Nadeshiko League Cup

References

Nadeshiko League Cup
2010 in Japanese women's football